Juan Manuel Delgado y Hernández de Tejada (2 May 1896 – 24 December 1974) was a Spanish épée and foil fencer. He competed at the 1924 and 1928 Summer Olympics.

References

External links
 

1896 births
1974 deaths
Spanish male épée fencers
Olympic fencers of Spain
Fencers at the 1924 Summer Olympics
Fencers at the 1928 Summer Olympics
Fencers from Madrid
Spanish male foil fencers